Yunis Nuri or Yunus Nuri (born 23 January 1878, Erivan, Erivan uezd, Erivan Governorate - d. 5 January 1950, Erivan, Armenian SSR) was a Azerbaijani actor, Honored Artist of the Armenian SSR (1935). He is one of the founders of the Azerbaijan theater in Yerevan.

Life 
Yunis Haji Suleiman oglu Suleymanov was born on January 23, 1878, in Erivan. He started playing in the theater in 1896 in Erivan and worked in the Yerevan Azerbaijan Theater until the end of his life.

He played such roles as Haji Kara ("Haji Kara", Mirza Fatali Akhundov), Soltan bey ("Arshin Mal Alan", Uzeyir Hajibeyov), a doctor ("The Doctor in Love" Jean Baptiste Molière), Atakishi, Allahverdi ("Sevil", "In 1905", Jafar Jabbarly), Giko ("Pepo", Gabriel Sundukian), Sheikh Nasrullah ("The Deads", Jalil Mammadguluzadeh) and others. Yunis Nuri also played in the movie. He starred in such films as "Khas-push", "Zangezur", "Fishermen of Sevana", "Anait" and others.

He died on January 5, 1950, in Yerevan.

See also 
 Yerevan state Azerbaijan dramatic theater

References

Sources 
 

1950 deaths
Actors from the Russian Empire
Armenian actors
Soviet actors
People from Yerevan
Armenian Azerbaijanis
1878 births